Chiatura is a city in the country of Georgia. It is the seat of an archbishop of the  Georgian Orthodox and Apostolic Church.

List of Orthodox archbishops of Chiatura

21st century: Abraham (Abraam) 
2010-Present (Acting): Metropolitan Daniel (Datuashvili)

References

Georgian Orthodox Church
Chiatura